Microgenys is a genus of characins from tropical South America.

Species
There are currently 3 recognized species in this genus:
 Microgenys lativirgata N. E. Pearson, 1927
 Microgenys minuta C. H. Eigenmann, 1913
 Microgenys weyrauchi Fowler, 1945

References

Characidae
Fish of South America